The Wulian Feng are a mountain range in Yunnan, China, forming the northwest edge of the Yungui Plateau. The mountains are more of an escarpment than a true mountain range, towering above the right bank of the Jinsha River as it enters the Sichuan Basin and becomes the Yangtze. They run entirely in Zhaotong Prefecture from the Jigongshan Grand Canyon of Ludian County in the southwest to Suijiang County in the northeast. The northern portion of the Wulian Feng exhibit more mountain-like characteristics as the Yungui Plateau is broken up here and valleys cut between the mountain peaks.

The highest point of the range is the -high summit of Dashanbao in the south which rises dramatically  from the west but rises only a mere  from the east.

Dashanbao Nature Reserve, at the height of the Wulian Feng, is an important Black-necked crane wintering site.

References 

Mountain ranges of Yunnan
Geography of Zhaotong